Police Stories is a top-down shooter video game developed by Mighty Morgan and published by HypeTrain Digital. The project was financed through the crowd funding platform Kickstarter in June 2017.

Gameplay 
Police Stories is a top-down shooter action game with tactical elements. It was released on September 19, 2019. The game consists of two main game modes: single-player, and an online cooperative gameplay mode. The player controls a pair of cops, John Rimes and Rick Jones, who have to burst into buildings, infiltrate gang hideouts, rescue hostages and make arrests. The game puts an emphasis on tactics and forces the player to make split second decisions. Every new run, criminals, hostages and pieces of evidence are placed randomly. Not knowing who's in a room until they reach the line of sight makes it very different from other top-down shooters like the game's inspirational "Hotline Miami".

The Surrender System in Police Stories allows to apprehend the suspects without resorting to violence. Each type of suspect not only has unique weapons, but different behaviour, tactics and shooting skills. To increase the chances of non-lethal neutralization, the player will need to combine tactics with non-lethal and breaching equipment, such as under door cameras or door blast charges.

Development 
An alpha version was released through itch.io on June 6, 2017. It includes 2 levels: “Raising The Bar” and “Free Fire” in which player needs to clean up the location and save hostages.

On July 2, 2017, Police Stories successfully raised $26,679 on Kickstarter with 555 backers.

On December 12, 2017, a beta version was released for Kickstarter backers who pledged $30 or more. It included 2 new levels, online co-op as well as regular updates.

On June 14, 2018, a huge update for a closed beta version was released (still available for Kickstarter backers only). It included all-new equipment system, new content and commands in row system as well as many fixes and gameplay improvements.

On October 2, 2018, it was stated that the game is still under active development. Developers worked on visual effects, story mode, new equipment and pathfinding systems improvements. Also a new version of Open Alpha was released on October 14, that included a new mission to play and new items to try out. Coop feature still stays exclusive for the Kickstarter backers.

On December 11, 2018, there was another update regarding the development process. The new blog post mentions in-game controller support, couch coop feature with HUD improvements, macOS version of the game.

On March 22, 2019, the developers unveiled that they are also working on the Level Editor application, that will be available for Windows only and will feature Steam Workshop integration. Also a Nintendo Switch release was teased which will be slightly different from the PC release (no online multiplayer, only local coop available, but the players can use even a single Joy-Con to play). Also it was announced that the game enters the final stage of development and the developers are focused on the content final polishing.

Reception 
On Metacritic, the PC version received positive reviews, and the Xbox One version received mixed reviews.  Sin Vega of Rock Paper Shotgun called it "tense and fast, almost to a Hotline Miami degree".

References

External links 
 

2019 video games
Indie video games
Nintendo Switch games
Linux games
Multiplayer and single-player video games
MacOS games
Video games using procedural generation
Shooter video games
Top-down video games
Video games developed in Russia
Windows games
GameMaker Studio games
Crowdfunded video games
Kickstarter-funded video games
Video games about police officers